Boubou Hama (1906 – 29 January 1982) was a Nigerien writer, historian, and politician. He was President of the National Assembly of Niger under President of Niger, Hamani Diori. He died in Niamey, in 1982.

Life and works 
Hama was born at Fonéko, a small Songhai village in western Niger. He studied at the École normale supérieure William Ponty and began his career as a teacher, in the mid-1920s becoming the first French-trained primary school teacher from what would soon become Niger.  As a writer he worked in many genres including history and theater. His writing gained international attention when his autobiography Kotia-nima (published with the support of UNESCO in 1971) won the Grand prix littéraire d'Afrique noire. His essay on African education won the Senghor Prize in the same year. His histories are said to place a great value on oral literature.

Political career
Hama had been one of the founders of the Nigerien Progressive Party (PPN), a regional branch of the African Democratic Rally (RDA), and rose to become a close adviser of party leader and Deputy to the French National Assembly Hamani Diori.  Following independence in 1960, the PPN became the ruling and sole legal party in Niger, and Hama became President of the National Assembly of Niger from 1961 to 1964.  He was also one of the most prominent, and perhaps most powerful, members of the PPN politburo, which became the effective ruling body of the nation.  One writer has called Boubou Hama the "eminence grise" behind Diori's rule. The National Assembly of Niger met in largely ceremonial yearly sittings to ratify government positions.  Traditional notables, elected as parliamentary representatives, often unanimously endorsed government proposals.  Diori was re-elected unopposed in 1965 and 1970, but overthrown by military coup in 1974.

References 

 BOUBOU HAMA: Enseignant, écrivain  et homme politique nigérien, collection of works by, and short biography of, Boubou Hama. Soumbala.com

Presidents of the National Assembly (Niger)
Nigerien non-fiction writers
1906 births
1982 deaths
Nigerien educators
Nigerien Progressive Party – African Democratic Rally politicians
Grand Crosses with Star and Sash of the Order of Merit of the Federal Republic of Germany
People from Tillabéri Region
20th-century non-fiction writers